SpaceEngine (stylized as SPΛCE ΞNGINE) is an interactive 3D planetarium and astronomy software developed by Russian astronomer and programmer Vladimir Romanyuk. It creates a 1:1 scale three-dimensional planetarium representing the entire observable universe from a combination of real astronomical data and scientifically-accurate procedural generation algorithms. Users can travel through space in any direction or speed, and forwards or backwards in time. SpaceEngine is in beta status and up to version 0.9.8.0E, released in August 2017, it was and still is available as download for Microsoft Windows. Version 0.990 beta was the first paid edition, released in June 2019 on Steam. The program has full support for VR headsets.

Properties of objects, such as temperature, mass, radius, spectrum, etc., are presented to the user on the HUD and in an accessible information window. Users can observe celestial objects ranging from small asteroids or moons to large galaxy clusters, akin to other simulators such as Celestia, OpenSpace, Gaia Sky, and Nightshade NG. The default version of SpaceEngine includes over 130,000 real objects, including stars from the Hipparcos catalog, galaxies from the NGC and IC catalogs, many well-known nebulae, and all known exoplanets and their stars.

Functionality 
 
The proclaimed goal of SpaceEngine is scientific realism, and to reproduce every type of known astronomical phenomenon. It uses star catalogs along with procedural generation to create a cubical universe 10 billion parsecs (32.6 billion light-years) on each side, centered on the barycenter of the Solar System. Within the software, users can use search tools to filter through astronomical objects based on certain characteristics. In the case of planets and moons, specific environmental types, surface temperatures, and pressures can be used to filter through the vast amount of different procedurally generated worlds.

SpaceEngine also has a built-in flight simulator (currently in Alpha) which allows for users to spawn in a selection of fictional spacecraft which can be flown in an accurate model of orbital mechanics and also an atmospheric flight model when entering the atmospheres of the various planets and moons. The spacecraft range from small SSTO spaceplanes, to large interstellar spacecraft which are all designed with realism in mind, featuring radiators, fusion rockets, and micrometeorite shields. Interstellar spacecraft simulate the hypothetical Alcubierre drive, including the relativistic effects that would occur in reality.

Catalog objects 
The real objects that SpaceEngine includes are the Hipparcos catalog for stars, the NGC and IC catalogs for galaxies, all known exoplanets, and prominent star clusters, nebulae, and Solar System objects including some comets and asteroids.

Wiki and locations
The software has its own built-in "wiki" database which gives detailed information on all celestial objects and enables a player to create custom names and descriptions for them. It also has a locations database where a player can save any position and time in the simulation and load it again in the future.

Extensions 
SpaceEngine has a fairly large modding community dedicated to expanding on the program's current catalogues, improving things like texture quality, and even improving the program's terrain and cloud generation as a whole (See Rodrigo's Mod). Some SE add-on creators create fictional star systems for their worldbuilding project, others do 3D modelling for spacecraft add-ons, and some do completely different things. These extensions are all available for download from SpaceEngine's Web Forums.

Limitations 
Although objects that form part of a planetary system move, and stars rotate about their axes and orbit each other in multiple star systems, stellar proper motion is not simulated, and galaxies are at fixed locations and do not rotate.

Most real-world spacecraft such as Voyager 2 are not provided with SpaceEngine. The few spacecraft that are included do not use real trajectories or accurate orientations.

Interstellar light absorption is not modeled in SpaceEngine.

Intrinsic variable stars are not supported by SpaceEngine. In fact most, if not all, simulators do not support intrinsic variable stars.

Gravity is not simulated in SpaceEngine, with the exception of the controllable spacecraft.

SpaceEngine's procedural generation algorithms are not 100% scientifically accurate, and can sometimes churn out unrealistic results. SpaceEngine's development team does fix, or at least attempt to fix, these issues when they arise, and are oftentimes successful. One such example is the removal of the old "step-stair terrain" bug that plagued older versions.

There is a current bug in the procedural planet order generation in star systems in SpaceEngine that is often called the "terra-gas giant" bug or the "procedural planet order generation bug", which is a bug that makes almost all star systems in SpaceEngine have a planet order pattern of terrestrial planet, gas giant, terrestrial planet, gas giant.  The bug has been present in all versions of SpaceEngine, and the development team has said that they will try to fix it in the future.

Ultimately, these limitations are a result of the algorithmic nature of SpaceEngine's procedural generation, since it is extremely hard, if not impossible, to make these algorithms 100% scientifically accurate.

Development
Development of SpaceEngine began in 2005, with its first public release in June 2010. The software is written in C++. The engine uses OpenGL as its graphical API and uses shaders written in GLSL. As of the release of version 0.990, the shaders have been encrypted to protect against plagiarism. Plans have been made to start opening them in a way that allows the community to develop special content for the game, with ship engine effects being made available to users who have purchased the game.

On May 27, 2019, the Steam store page for SpaceEngine was made public in preparation for the release of the first paid version, 0.990 beta.

SpaceEngine is currently only available for Windows PCs; however, there is plans for the software to support macOS and Linux in the future. Even though SpaceEngine only natively supports Windows, the Steam version can be run on Linux via Steam's Proton compatibility tool.

See also
Celestia
Space flight simulation game
List of space flight simulation games
Planetarium software
List of observatory software
 List of games with Oculus Rift support
 Gravity (software)

References

External links
 
 Russian language website
 SpaceEngine Forum

2010 video games
Astronomy software
Science software for Windows
Steam Greenlight games
Video game engines
Articles containing video clips
Video games developed in Russia
Windows games
Windows-only games